Joseph Wang Yu-jung (27 April 1931 – 18 January 2018) was a Roman Catholic bishop.

Ordained to the priesthood in 1955, Wang Yu-jung served as auxiliary bishop for the Roman Catholic Archdiocese of Taipei, Taiwan, from 1975 to 1986. He then served as bishop of the Diocese of Taichung from 1986 to 2007.

Joseph Wang served as the chairman of Fu Jen Catholic University from 2008 to 2009.

Notes

1933 births 
2018 deaths
20th-century Roman Catholic bishops in Taiwan
21st-century Roman Catholic bishops in Taiwan